Blonde are an English deep house production duo from Bristol, consisting of Jacob Manson and Adam Englefield. They are signed to Parlophone.

Musical career
Blonde premiered the track "It's You" via Englefield's dance music YouTube channel Eton Messy in July 2013. In May 2014, Blonde released their debut single "Foolish", which features vocals from Ryan Ashley. In July 2014, they released their second single "Higher Ground", which features vocals from Charli Taft. They came to prominence in the UK after BBC Radio 1 playlisted their single "I Loved You", which the station named their track of the day in October 2014 and was heavily praised by Radio 1 DJ Greg James on his dance anthems programme. "I Loved You", which features reggae and pop singer Melissa Steel, and received favourable coverage in Clash and Heat magazines. The song entered the UK Singles Chart at number seven and the Scottish Singles Chart at number ten.

Blonde released a fourth single, "All Cried Out", featuring vocals from Glee actor Alex Newell; it reached number four in the UK. The duo's fifth single, "Feel Good (It's Alright)", features Karen Harding.

When it came into 2016, they collaborated with returning record producer and star to the music industry Craig David on the song "Nothing Like This".  It was part of David's collaborative period which included artists such as Big Narstie, Katy B and Kaytranada and is also a single off of his sixth studio album, entitled Following My Intuition.

Blonde also featured as well as co-written Imani Williams's debut single, entitled "Don't Need No Money", alongside rising house record producer and DJ Sigala. Together, they took part in first ever major featured project as independent musicians. Imani got the inspiration of the track after she exploded into the music industry with Sigala on his 2016 single "Say You Do", alongside drum and bass music producer DJ Fresh. 

They also co-wrote the Rudimental and Ed Sheeran song "Lay It All on Me" with Johnny Harris and James Newman. The song was originally conceived in a session between Blonde, Harris and Newman before being pitched to Rudimental. Ed Sheeran was later brought in on the track and re-wrote the break of the song.

Discography

Singles

As lead artist

Under the "Eton Messy" label

As featured artist

Songwriting and production credits

References

English house music duos
Deep house musicians
Electronic dance music duos
Musical groups established in 2012
Musical groups from Bristol
Parlophone artists
Warner Records artists
2012 establishments in England